The Abkhaz–Georgian conflict involves ethnic conflict between Georgians and the Abkhaz people in Abkhazia, a de facto independent, partially recognized republic. In a broader sense, one can view the Georgian–Abkhaz conflict as part of a geopolitical conflict in the Caucasus region, intensified at the end of the 20th century with the dissolution of the Soviet Union in 1991.

The conflict, one of the bloodiest in the post-Soviet era, remains unresolved. The Georgian government has offered substantial autonomy to Abkhazia several times. However, both the Abkhaz government and the opposition in Abkhazia refuse any form of union with Georgia. Abkhaz regard their independence as the result of a war of liberation from Georgia, while Georgians believe that historically Abkhazia has always formed part of Georgia. Georgians formed the single largest ethnic group in pre-war Abkhazia, with a 45.7% plurality as of 1989. During the war the Abkhaz separatist side carried out an ethnic cleansing campaign which resulted in the expulsion of up to 250,000 and in the killing of more than 5,000 ethnic Georgians. The Organization for Security and Co-operation in Europe (OSCE) conventions of Lisbon, Budapest and Istanbul have officially recognized the ethnic cleansing of Georgians, which UN General Assembly Resolution GA/10708 also mentions. The UN Security Council has passed a series of resolutions in which it appeals for a cease-fire.

Soviet era 
Both Abkhazia and other Georgian principalities were annexed into the Russian Empire in the nineteenth century, and remained part of it until the Russian Revolutions of 1917. While Georgia initially joined the Transcaucasian Democratic Federative Republic and subsequently became independent as the Democratic Republic of Georgia (DRG) in 1918, Abkhazia was initially controlled by a group of Bolsheviks, before ultimately joining the DRG, though its status was never clarified. In 1921 the Red Army invaded Abkhazia and Georgia, eventually incorporating them into the Transcaucasian Socialist Federative Soviet Republic. Initially Abkhazia was formed as an independent Soviet republic, the Socialist Soviet Republic of Abkhazia (SSR Abkhazia), though it was united with the Georgian Soviet Socialist Republic by a treaty; in 1931 the SSR Abkhazia was downgraded to an autonomous republic within the Georgian SSR, to much opposition from the Abkhaz.

Throughout the Soviet era the Abkhazians called for their quasi-independent status to be restored. Demonstrations in support of this occurred in 1931 immediately after the dissolution of the SSR Abkhazia, and again in 1957, 1967, 1978, and 1989. In 1978, 130 representatives of the Abkhaz intelligentia signed a letter to the Soviet leadership, protesting against what they saw as Georgianization of Abkhazia.

War in Abkhazia 

The conflict involved a war in Abkhazia, which lasted for 13 months, beginning in August, 1992, with Georgian government forces and a militia composed of ethnic Georgians who lived in Abkhazia and separatist forces consisting of ethnic Abkhazians, Armenians and Russians who also lived in Abkhazia. The separatists were supported by the North Caucasian and Cossack militants and (unofficially) by Russian forces stationed in Gudauta. The conflict resulted in an agreement in Sochi to cease hostilities, however, this would not last.

Resumption of hostilities 

In April–May 1998, the conflict escalated once again in the Gali District when several hundred Abkhaz forces entered the villages still populated by Georgians to support the separatist-held parliamentary elections. Despite criticism from the opposition, Eduard Shevardnadze, President of Georgia, refused to deploy troops against Abkhazia. A ceasefire was negotiated on May 20. The hostilities resulted in hundreds of casualties from both sides and an additional 20,000 Georgian refugees.

In September 2001, around 400 Chechen fighters and 80 Georgian guerrillas appeared in the Kodori Valley. The Chechen-Georgian paramilitaries advanced as far as Sukhumi, but finally were repelled by the Abkhazian forces and Gudauta-based Russian peacekeepers.

Saakashvili era 
The new Georgian government of President Mikheil Saakashvili promised not to use force and to resolve the problem only by diplomacy and political talks.

While at a Commonwealth of Independent States (CIS) summit it was decided not to carry out contacts with separatists, the trans-border economic cooperation and transport between Abkhazia and Russia grew in scale, with Russia claiming that all this is a matter of private business, rather than state. Georgia also decried the unlimited issuing of Russian passports in Abkhazia with subsequent payment of retirement pensions and other monetary benefits by Russia, which Georgia considers to be economic support of separatists by the Russian government.

In May 2006 the Coordinating Council of Georgia’s Government and Abkhaz separatists was convened for the first time since 2001. In late July the 2006 Kodori crisis erupted, resulting in the establishment of the de jure Government of Abkhazia in Kodori. For the first time after the war, this government is located in Abkhazia, and is headed by Malkhaz Akishbaia, Temur Mzhavia and Ada Marshania.

On May 15, 2008 United Nations General Assembly adopted resolution recognising the right of all refugees (including victims of reported “ethnic cleansing”) to return to Abkhazia and their property rights. It "regretted" the attempts to alter pre-war demographic composition and called for the "rapid development of a timetable to ensure the prompt voluntary return of all refugees and internally displaced persons to their homes."

August 2008 

On August 10, 2008, the Russo-Georgian War spread to Abkhazia, where separatist rebels and the Russian air force launched an all-out attack on Georgian forces. Abkhazia's pro-Moscow separatist President Sergei Bagapsh said that his troops had launched a major "military operation" to force Georgian troops out of the Kodori Gorge, which they still controlled. As a result of this attack, Georgian troops were driven out of Abkhazia entirely.

On August 26, 2008, the Russian Federation officially recognized both South Ossetia and Abkhazia as independent states.

In response to Russia's recognition of Abkhazia and South Ossetia, the Georgian government announced that the country cut all diplomatic relations with Russia and that it left the Commonwealth of Independent States.

After the war 
Relations between Georgia and Abkhazia have remained tense after the war. Georgia has moved to increase Abkhazia's isolation by imposing a sea blockade of Abkhazia. During the opening ceremony of a new building of the Georgian Embassy in Kyiv (Ukraine) in November 2009, Georgian President Mikheil Saakashvili stated that residents of South Ossetia and Abkhazia could also use its facilities. "I would like to assure you, my dear friends, that this is your home, as well, and here you will always be able to find support and understanding", he said.

On July 9, 2012, the OSCE Parliamentary Assembly passed a resolution at its annual session in Monaco, underlining Georgia’s territorial integrity and referring to breakaway Abkhazia and South Ossetia as “occupied territories”. The resolution “urges the Government and the Parliament of the Russian Federation, as well as the de facto authorities of Abkhazia, Georgia and South Ossetia, Georgia, to allow the European Union Monitoring Mission unimpeded access to the occupied territories.” It also says that the OSCE Parliamentary Assembly is “concerned about the humanitarian situation of the displaced persons both in Georgia and in the occupied territories of Abkhazia, Georgia and South Ossetia, Georgia, as well as the denial of the right of return to their places of living.”

See also

 Abkhazia–Georgia border
 Georgian–Ossetian conflict
 Russo-Georgian War
 Politics of Abkhazia
 Transnistria conflict

Notes

Bibliography

Further reading
 Blair, Heather "Ethnic Conflict as a Tool of Outside Influence: An Examination of Abkhazia and Kosovo.", 2007
 Goltz, Thomas. "Georgia Diary: A Chronicle of War and Political Chaos in the Post-Soviet Caucasus".M.E. Sharpe (2006). 
 Lynch, Dov. The Conflict in Abkhazia: Dilemmas in Russian 'Peacekeeping' Policy. Royal Institute of International Affairs, February 1998.
 MacFarlane, S., N., “On the front lines in the near abroad: the CIS and the OSCE in Georgia’ s civil wars", Third World Quarterly, Vol 18, No 3, pp 509– 525, 1997.
 Marshania, L., Tragedy of Abkhazia, Moscow, 1996
 McCallion, Amy Abkhazian Separatism
 Steele, Jon. "War Junkie: One Man`s Addiction to the Worst Places on Earth" Corgi (2002). 
 White Book of Abkhazia. 1992–1993 Documents, Materials, Evidences. Moscow, 1993.

External links

 Accord issue on the Georgia Abkhazia peace process also includes chronology and key texts & agreements. 

 Documented accounts of ethnic cleansing of Abkhazians by Georgians 
 Government of Abkhazia (-in-exile)

 
History of Abkhazia
Wars involving Georgia (country)
Ethnic cleansing of Georgians in Abkhazia
Georgia (country)–Russia relations
20th century in Georgia (country)
21st century in Georgia (country)
Territorial disputes of Georgia (country)
Conflicts in 2022
1980s in Georgia (country)
1990s in Georgia (country)
2000s in Georgia (country)
2010s in Georgia (country)
1989 in Georgia (country)
1990s in Abkhazia
2000s in Abkhazia
2010s in Abkhazia
Proxy wars
Post-Soviet conflicts